Begogo is a rural commune in Madagascar. It belongs to the district of Iakora, which is a part of Ihorombe Region. The population of the commune was 11,146 in 2018.

Only primary schooling is available. Farming and raising livestock provides employment for 49.95% and 49.95% of the working population. The most important crops are rice and beans, while other important agricultural products are peanuts and cassava. Services provide employment for 0.1% of the population.

See also
the Kalambatritra Reserve that is situated in this municipality.

References 

Populated places in Ihorombe